Ross Petty is a Canadian actor and theatre producer.

Ross Petty may also refer to:
 Ross Petty (American football), American football guard who played for the Decatur Staleys of the National Football League
 Ross Petty (pediatrician), Canadian pediatric rheumatologist